The 1982 Nebraska gubernatorial election was held on November 2, 1982, and featured businessman Bob Kerrey, a Democrat, narrowly defeating incumbent Republican Governor Charles Thone.

Democratic primary

Candidates
George B. Burrows
Bob Kerrey, businessman and Vietnam War veteran

Results

Republican primary

Candidates
Barton E. Chandler
Stan Deboer
Charles Thone, incumbent Governor

Results

General election

Results

References

Gubernatorial
1982
Nebraska